Ethoxzolamide (alternatively known as ethoxyzolamide) is a sulfonamide medication that functions as a carbonic anhydrase inhibitor.  It is used in the treatment of glaucoma and duodenal ulcers, and as a diuretic.  It may also be used in the treatment of some forms of epilepsy.

Pharmacology
Ethoxzolamide, a sulfonamide, inhibits carbonic anhydrase activity in proximal renal tubules to decrease reabsorption of water, sodium, potassium, bicarbonate. It also decreases carbonic anhydrase in the CNS, increasing the seizure threshold. This reduction in carbonic anhydrase also reduces the intraocular pressure in the eye by decreasing aqueous humor.

Mechanism of action
Ethoxzolamide binds and inhibits carbonic anhydrase I. Carbonic anhydrase plays an essential role in facilitating the transport of carbon dioxide and protons in the intracellular space, across biological membranes and in the layers of the extracellular space. The inhibition of this enzyme effects the balance of applicable membrane equilibrium systems.

Synthesis

See also
 Dimazole
 Dithiazanine iodide

References

Anticonvulsants
Benzothiazoles
Carbonic anhydrase inhibitors
Phenol ethers
Sulfonamides